Dragiša Milović (born 1957) is a Kosovo Serb politician. He was the president (i.e., mayor) of Zvečan, a predominantly Serb community in the north of Kosovo on the border with Central Serbia, from 2002 to 2013 as a member of the Democratic Party of Serbia (Demokratska stranka Srbije, DSS). He was re-elected to the same position in 2021 as a candidate of the Serb List (Srpska lista, SL).

Private career
Milović is a medical doctor and an orthopedic specialist. He is deputy director of KBC Kosovska Mitrovica.

Politician
Milović was a founding member of the Serbian National Council of Kosovo and Metohija in January 1999 and was the initial chair of its initiative committee. He indicated that the council had been formed due to the dissatisfaction of Kosovo Serbs with the Serbian government's policies in the province. He was quoted as saying, "We Serbs from Kosovo-Metohija cannot be represented by the so-called Provisional Executive Council [set up by the Belgrade authorities] at the forthcoming [...] negotiations with the Albanians. It seems that the reason for setting it up was to once again surrender Serb land [...] without too much commotion. We do not accept any proposals which restrict the sovereignty and violate the territorial integrity of Serbia."

In the aftermath of the 1998–99 Kosovo War, the United Nations Interim Administration Mission in Kosovo (UNMIK) was set up as a temporary authority in the province. In 2000, the Organisation for Economic Co-operation and Development (OECD) organized local elections under the auspices of UNMIK; these were largely boycotted by the Serb community, whose leaders argued that the security situation had not sufficiently improved to allow Serbs to return to their homes. Acting as a spokesperson for Oliver Ivanović, Milović said that Serbs in northern Kosovo would "[would] not register or take part in the vote until Serbs start returning to Kosovo in bigger numbers."

Milović served as vice-president of the Zvečan municipal assembly in this period; the position was at the time equivalent to deputy mayor. He was removed from office in June 2000 (along with mayor Desimir Petković) on the grounds of his willingness to negotiate with UNMIK. By 2002, however, he had been returned to the position. As an ally of Oliver Ivanović, he resigned from the Serbian National Council executive in June 2001 following Ivanović's removal.

Mayor of Zvečan (2002–13)
The Kosovo Serb community generally participated in the 2002 local elections in northern Kosovo, except in Kosovska Mitrovica. Milović appeared in the lead position on the DSS's electoral list for Zvečan and was elected when the list won five out of seventeen seats. No party won a clear victory, and the DSS was able to form a coalition government with Milović as mayor. In a meeting with UNMIK leader Michael Steiner shortly after his election, Milović said that the United Nations mission had failed in its goals. "Even after three and a half years there has been no mass return of Serbs," he said, "while there is no safety and freedom of movement for the remaining Serb population in the province."

In 2004, Milović said that his administration would not accommodate "destabilizing" actions, citing UNMIK's recent decision to turn over municipal police responsibilities to the Kosovo Police without local consultation or approval. In August 2005, he said that parts of Zvečan were experiencing serious water shortages due to the decision of the Priština authorities to withhold necessary water supplies from Serb communities in the north.

At a protest to mark the two-year anniversary of the 2004 unrest in Kosovo, Milović said that "a settlement to the status of Kosovo must be arrived at through compromise, international law and the borders must be respected, there must be no winners and losers." Later in the year, he welcomed the approval of a new Serbian constitution that recognized Kosovo and Metohija as an integral party of the country with significant autonomy.

The Serb community in northern Kosovo generally boycotted the 2007 local elections, which took place against the backdrop of the province's drive for independence. Milović did not accept the elections as legitimate and was not a candidate. Like most Kosovo Serb politicians, he opposed Kosovo's unilateral declaration of independence in 2008 and still considers Kosovo to be a province of Serbia.

The Serbian government organized its own local elections in Kosovo in 2008. Although not recognized internationally, the vote provided de facto legitimacy to the governing authorities in Zvečan and in the neighbouring municipalities of Leposavić, Zubin Potok, and northern Kosovska Mitrovica. The DSS actually finished second against the far-right Serbian Radical Party (Srpska radikalna stranka, SRS) in Zvečan, but Milović was able to form a new coalition administration with smaller parties and continue in office as mayor. The authorities in Priština later organized new local elections in 2009; as in 2007, these were generally boycotted by the Serb community and had no practical effect on the local government of Zvečan.

In June 2009, Milović took part in a protest against the introduction of new customs measures on the border between Kosovo and Central Serbia. He said that Serbs did not oppose paying taxes to Serbia's government but did not want their money to support Kosovo's breakaway institutions. He was quoted as saying, "We want to confirm that the blockade is not aimed at the police or KFOR, only against the customs and that should be clear to everyone."

Milović condemned an attack on an Albanian-owned bakery in Zvečan in 2010, saying, "the Albanians, citizens of our municipality, ten years since the arrival of the UN mission, have had no problems. We insist and urge the police to find those perpetrators."

North Kosovo Crisis
In 2011, Kosovo Police crossed into the predominantly Serb municipalities of northern Kosovo, without consulting either Serbia or Kosovo Force (KFOR)/EULEX, in an attempt to assert control over several administrative border crossings. This action precipitated what became known as the North Kosovo crisis, in which members of northern Kosovo's Serb community restricted highway traffic with blockades and roadblocks. Milović was a leader of the community's actions, working alongside fellow mayors Slaviša Ristić of Zubin Potok, Branko Ninić of Leposavić, and Krstimir Pantić of northern Kosovska Mitrovica.

In August 2011, the governments in Belgrade and Priština announced a deal that would have seen the North Atlantic Treaty Organization (NATO) continue to guard two of the border posts. Local Serbs objected to a key aspect of the deal, however, and the blockades continued. Addressing a crowd of protesters, Milović said, "We will stay at the barricades because as mayors of northern Kosovo we are obliged to respect the opinion of the local people. We don't want to oppose the Serbian state but we want to respect your decisions." He subsequently joined with Ristić and Pantić to request the removal of Borko Stefanović from the Belgrade–Pristina negotiations in Brussels, arguing that Stefanović did not enjoy the support of the Kosovo Serb community. A December 2011 report in the Serbian paper Blic described Milović as the second-most important figure in coordinating the Serb community's actions after his fellow DSS mayor Ristić; both mayors were described as enjoying support from their electorate that transcended normal party divisions.

The municipalities of Zubin Potok and Zvečan organized new municipal elections in 2012 on the grounds that the four-year mandates from 2008 were due to expire. The broader diplomatic situation had changed by this time, and the elections were not officially recognized by either Belgrade or Priština. The DSS won in both municipalities, and Ristić and Milović continued as to serve as mayors. Ultimately, the Serbian government did not overturn the results.

2013 Brussels Agreement
Milović called for the views of Kosovo Serbs to be taken into account during negotiations for the 2013 Brussels Agreement and said that an assembly of northern Kosovo could otherwise be established. The final agreement normalized some aspects of the relationship between Serbia and Kosovo without addressing the latter's status; the Serbian government made some efforts to win local support for the deal, though ultimately both Ristić and Milović opposed it.

The Serbian government dissolved the assemblies of Zvečan and other the three Serb municipalities in northern Kosovo in September 2013, thereby ending Milović's tenure as mayor. Milović did not participate in the 2013 local elections (which were supported by both Belgrade and Priština, and which saw the direct election of mayors) due to calls from some members of the community for a boycott. He was quoted as saying, "We cannot participate in elections that were called by the provisional government in Priština which is recognized by neither Kosovo Serbs nor Serbia."

2017 candidacy and return to the mayor's office in 2021
Notwithstanding Milović's opposition, Kosovo Serbs generally participated in the 2013 local elections. Milović later ended his boycott strategy and was a mayoral candidate in the 2017 local elections, running on an independent list called For Our Zvečan as an ally of Oliver Ivanović. He finished a distant second against incumbent Vučina Janković of the Serb List. Milović's car was torched during the campaign. Following Ivanović's assassination by unknown parties in early 2018, Milović gave an interview in which he lamented the power of organized crime in northern Kosovo.

Milović subsequently joined the Serb List and was re-elected as mayor of Zvečan under its banner in the 2021 local elections. He operates in a parallel (or, most precisely, overlapping) authority with that of Ivan Todosijević, who is recognized by the Serbian government as the leader of a provisional authority in Zvečan.

Politics at the republic level in Serbia
Milović appeared in the 107th position on the Democratic Party of Serbia's electoral list in the 2003 Serbian parliamentary election. The list won fifty-three seats, and he was not given a mandate afterwards. (From 2000 to 2011, Serbian parliamentary mandates were awarded to sponsoring parties or coalitions rather than to individual candidates, and it was common practice for the mandates to be awarded out of numerical order. Milović could have been awarded a seat in the assembly notwithstanding his position on the list, although in fact he was not.) He later appeared in the 201st position on a combined DSS–New Serbia list in the 2008 parliamentary election and did not receive a seat after the list won thirty mandates.

Serbia's electoral system was reformed in 2011, such that mandates were awarded to candidates on successful lists in numerical order. Milović appeared in the sixty-second position on the DSS list in the 2012 Serbian parliamentary election and was not elected when the list won twenty-one seats. He left the DSS after Vojislav Koštunica retired as leader.

Electoral record

Local

Notes

References

1957 births
Living people
People from Zvečan
Kosovo Serbs
Mayors of places in Serbia
Mayors of places in Kosovo
Democratic Party of Serbia politicians
Serb List (Kosovo) politicians